Ransom Township may refer to:

 Ransom Township, Michigan
 Ransom Township, Nobles County, Minnesota
 Ransom Township, Columbus County, North Carolina, in Columbus County, North Carolina
 Ransom Township, Sargent County, North Dakota, in Sargent County, North Dakota
 Ransom Township, Lackawanna County, Pennsylvania

Township name disambiguation pages